Louise Marie Lasser (born April 11, 1939) is an American actress, television writer, and performing arts teacher and director. She is known for her portrayal of the title character on the soap opera satire Mary Hartman, Mary Hartman. She was married to Woody Allen and appeared in several of his early films. She is also a life member of The Actors Studio and studied with both Sanford Meisner and Robert X. Modica.

Early life and career beginnings
Born in New York City, Lasser is the only child of Paula Lasser (née Cohen) and Sol Jay Lasser. Her father wrote and published the Everyone's Income Tax Guide series in the 1970s and 1980s. Louise did not fully embrace her Jewish heritage until later in life. 

Her mother's emotional instability led to a 1961 suicide attempt that was thwarted by Louise herself. Her mother vowed to never forgive Lasser for her actions, and after divorcing her husband, finally took her own life in 1964. Sol Jay Lasser later also committed suicide.

Lasser studied political science at Brandeis University for three years. She sang in Greenwich Village coffee shops and bars and performed in improvisational revues before understudying Barbra Streisand as "Miss Marmelstein" in the Broadway musical I Can Get It for You Wholesale. She also acted on the soap opera The Doctors and in television commercials.

Lasser married Woody Allen in 1966. Although the couple divorced in 1970, she appeared in his films Take the Money and Run (1969), Bananas (1971), and Everything You Always Wanted to Know About Sex* (*But Were Afraid to Ask) (1972). She also served as a voice actor for Allen's 1966 spoof dubbing of the Japanese spy movie, What's Up Tiger Lily? Lasser cites Allen as "a tremendous influence -- but it's the influence to make me be me....I remember the day he said, 'I do jokes...your comedy is attitude.'"

Her other 1970s comedic turns in cinema include Such Good Friends (1971) and Slither (1973). On television, she earned credits on Love, American Style (1971), The Bob Newhart Show (1972), and The Mary Tyler Moore Show (1973). She also appeared in the 1973 TV-movie version of Ingmar Bergman's The Lie and was featured as Elaine in an episode of the NBC romantic anthology series Love Story.

Mary Hartman, Mary Hartman

Production
Lasser's breakthrough role came as the unhappy, neurotic titular character in the soap opera satire Mary Hartman, Mary Hartman, which aired five nights a week for two seasons from January 1976 until July 1977. Some markets aired it at different times of the day and night and also in a block format which showcased all the week's episodes in a row. During the program's run, Lasser became a household name and appeared on the covers of Newsweek, People, and Rolling Stone. In his biography, producer Norman Lear said that the casting of Lasser took less than a minute after Charles H. Joffe told him that there was only one actress to play the part of Mary Hartman. Lasser initially refused the role but later acquiesced. Lear says that "when she read a bit of the script for me, I all but cried for joy...Louise brought with her the persona that fit Mary Hartman like a corset."

Of her brief yet memorable time on the series, Lasser surmises: "I could go into anyone's kitchen in America and have dinner. It was the best and worst of times."

Exhausted from the grueling schedule demands, Lasser left the series after two seasons and 325 episodes. The serial was rebranded Forever Fernwood, which centered on the lives of the other Mary Hartman, Mary Hartman characters and lasted for 26 more weeks. In an interview for the bonus features of the Mary Hartman, Mary Hartman DVD box set from Shout! Factory, Lasser reveals that the idea for Mary's nervous breakdown at the end of the first season came after she wrote a 12-page letter suggesting the idea to Norman Lear.

The dollhouse incident
In the spring of 1976 in Los Angeles, Lasser was arrested at a charity boutique, and police found $6 worth (or 88 milligrams) of cocaine in her purse. Authorities were called after Lasser's American Express card was denied and Lasser refused to leave without possession of a $150 dollhouse. Lasser was initially apprehended for two unpaid traffic tickets (one for jaywalking), but the officers then found the drug in her handbag. Lasser claimed the coke had been given to her several months earlier by a fan. Ultimately, Lasser was ordered to do six months in counseling, which was easily satisfied as she was already seeing an analyst. A fictionalized version of the dollhouse incident was also incorporated into Mary Hartman's first season.

Legacy
Mary Hartman, Mary Hartman offers "Kitchen Sink Theater of the Absurd" featuring a Candide-esque TV-watching housewife who, in one signature episode, brings a sick neighbor a bowl of chicken soup, only to have him fall asleep and drown in it. "I have actually taken a human life with my chicken soup," Mary laments. While some called the production ahead of its time, Lasser has pointed out that this post-Watergate, existential satirical comedy-drama also reflects its time period perfectly.

As author Claire Barliant writes: "For some, the 1970s...was a descent into chaos, a dissolution of self, but also a kind of awakening....The Seventies' nervous breakdown coincides with women's lib and a strengthening gay rights movement....[Mary Hartman, Mary Hartman] is relevant today because it entertains but still shocks, because the social commentary and satire and bravery of the show are as fresh as ever." Moreover, Lasser as the series' figurehead aptly embodies both the insanity and enlightenment of the epoch.

In 2000, Lasser appeared on a panel with her former Mary Hartman, Mary Hartman cast and crew members at the Paley Center for Media in Beverly Hills. The seminar, entitled Mary Hartman, Mary Hartman: Reunion, Reunion, was moderated by Steven A. Bell and taped for the museum archives.

In 2004 and 2007, Mary Hartman, Mary Hartman was ranked No. 21 and No. 26 on TV Guide'''s Top Cult Shows Ever.

SNL appearance and controversy
On 24 July 1976, Lasser hosted the penultimate episode of Saturday Night Live's first season. Her performance is best known for her opening monologue in which she re-creates a Mary Hartman-esque nervous breakdown and locks herself in her dressing room. She is then coaxed out by Chevy Chase/Land Shark and the promise of appearing on the cover of Time.

Some reports claim that Lasser's erratic behavior on the show led to her being the first person banned from SNL. Chase accused her of "solipsism", and SNL writer Michael O'Donoghue called her "clinically berserk" and allegedly walked off that week's installment in disgust. O'Donoghue did concede that Lasser "was a nice woman going through a few problems, but I wanted to force her to eat her goddamn pigtails at gunpoint".

Lasser denies that she was ever forbidden from coming back. According to Lasser, she was initially told she would be able to write her own material but that promise was later reneged on, and she also refused to do sketches she deemed "salacious": one in particular featured Lasser and Gilda Radner as teenagers talking about male genitalia. Ultimately, Jane Curtin appeared in the skit with Radner instead.

Lasser also asserts that her SNL antics, which include stream-of-consciousness rambling (typical of her Mary Hartman character), were "on purpose" and that Lorne Michaels pulled repeats of the broadcast only at her manager's request because her manager was not fond of the whole affair, including the final segment in which the actress sat onstage to discuss her rise to fame and the dollhouse incident. Lasser mostly performs by herself on the program but also appears in a vignette with a dog at a table.

Lasser called Chase "like-a-bully mean" but Radner "a doll". But aside from the intro segment in which Radner and Dan Aykroyd knock on her changing room door, Chase was the only regular player with whom Lasser had any scenes. Lasser and Chase appear as lovers in an Ingmar Bergman parody; plus, the pair filmed a sequence at the Madison Square Garden Democratic National Convention (although the footage was never aired). Instead, there is a video short in a diner in which she and her partner, played by Alan Zweibel, try to break up but forget their lines; in the end, Lasser moves to the bar and sits next to Michael Sarrazin. Lorne Michaels also briefly shows up in the clip, which ends with "a film by Louise Lasser" credit.

According to Lasser, "For me to threaten to walk off the show, I would never do that for spite. Banned—that's a horrible thing to have said."Mary Hartman, Mary Hartman producer Norman Lear and co-star Mary Kay Place also hosted SNL during the run of Mary Hartman, Mary Hartman.Other roles and appearances
Following her departure from Mary Hartman, Mary Hartman, Lasser wrote a made-for-TV movie titled Just Me and You (1978) and starred in it with Charles Grodin.

Her post-Mary Hartman, Mary Hartman stage credits include A Coupla White Chicks Sitting Around Talking and Marie and Bruce (1980).

She had a recurring role as Alex's ex-wife on the hit series Taxi and starred in the 1981–82 season of It's a Living, in which she played waitress Maggie McBurney.

Lasser had a recurring role on St. Elsewhere in the mid-1980s as Victor Ehrlich's Aunt Charise, a neurotic comic character. Her 1980s film appearances included Stardust Memories (1980), In God We Tru$t (1980), Crimewave (1985), Blood Rage (1987), Surrender (1987), Rude Awakening (1989) and as the mother of the main character in Sing (1989).

Her 1990s films included Frankenhooker (1990), The Night We Never Met (1993), Sudden Manhattan (1996), Layin' Low (1996) and as the mother of the three main female characters in Todd Solondz's film Happiness (1998). She appeared in Mystery Men (1999) as the mother of Hank Azaria's character. She also had roles in Darren Aronofsky's film Requiem for a Dream (2000), the romantic comedy Fast Food Fast Women (2000) and co-starred with Renée Taylor in National Lampoon's Gold Diggers (2003). Lasser acted in two episodes of HBO's Girls as a Manhattan artist for the series' third season (2014). 

In 2021, she was reunited with her Mary Hartman co-star Greg Mullavey in a 16-minute film short called Bliss.

In 2022, she appeared in Funny Pages, her first role in a theatrical feature film in almost 20 years.

Awards and recognition
In 1967, Lasser became the first woman to win a Clio Award for Best Actress in a Commercial. She was nominated for an Emmy Award for her performance in Mary Hartman, Mary Hartman and won the National Board of Review Award for Best Acting by an Ensemble for her participation in the film Happiness.

Directing career
She has been a faculty member of HB Studio, where she taught acting technique.

In 2014, she directed the Off-Off-Broadway production of Ira Lewis' Chinese Coffee''.

Currently, she lives in Manhattan and runs the Louise Lasser Acting Studio on the Upper East Side.

Filmography

References

External links

Living people
Actresses from New York City
American stage actresses
American musical theatre actresses
American film actresses
American television writers
American television actresses
Brandeis University alumni
Jewish American actresses
Screenwriters from New York (state)
American women television writers
Woody Allen
1939 births